The Skyline-to-the-Sea Trail is a 29.5-mile (47.2-kilometre) hiking trail that descends from the ridge of the Santa Cruz Mountains in California to the Pacific Ocean, passing through Castle Rock State Park and Big Basin Redwoods State Park. Big Basin is California's oldest state park. It contains beautiful waterfalls and some of the largest, tallest, and oldest Redwood forests left in existence.

After the August 2020 CZU Lightning Complex fires, the trail closed, along with much of Big Basin Redwoods State Park. As of December 2021, the trail remains closed and its future is unclear.

The trail usually takes two to three days to complete, with nearly all thru-hikers traveling from East to West (towards the ocean). It is possible to walk the entire trail in one day, though this is unusual and very difficult. However, there is a 50-km (31-mi) ultra running race held on this trail one or two times per year. Many hikers like to take a detour up Berry Creek Trail to see the waterfalls or to camp at Sunset Trail Camp, adding  to the hike.

The trail begins at Saratoga Gap on the ridge at the intersection of SR 9 and Skyline Boulevard (SR 35), although many hikers actually begin at Castle Rock due to its overnight parking facility. The trail parallels SR 9 through Castle Rock, crosses the highway, and then follows SR 236 to Big Basin park headquarters. It then descends through Big Basin, following Waddell Creek to its outlet at Waddell Beach.

Santa Cruz Metro routes 35 and 40 formerly went from Big Basin State Park Headquarters to Waddell Creek and back. Since September 2011, Route 40 no longer goes all the way to Waddell Beach from mid-December to mid-March. but instead turns around at Cement Plant Rd. Route 35 formerly stopped at Big Basin Headquarters on the weekends during the Spring/Summer season.

As of October 2020, there is 3.6 mile (5.8 km) extension that creates a "Saratoga-to-the-Sea" Trail. The trail originates at Saratoga Quarry Park, and terminates at Sanborn-Skyline County Park. This trail connects to the Skyline-to-the-Sea Trail via a completed section of the Bay Area Ridge Trail. The park is owned by the city of Saratoga's Parks Department.

References

External links 
 Hiking Trails in Santa Cruz County - Santa Cruz Wiki

Trails in the San Francisco Bay Area
Protected areas of Santa Cruz County, California
Santa Cruz Mountains